Paccharaju (possibly from Ancash Quechua paqtsa waterfall, rahu snow mountain, "waterfall snow peak") is a mountain of  (or ) of elevation in the Cordillera Blanca in the Andes of Peru. It is located between the provinces of Asunción Province and Carhuaz, in Ancash; southwest of mount Tarush Kancha, inside Huascarán National Park.

References

External links 

Mountains of Peru
Mountains of Ancash Region
Huascarán National Park